Bharatiya Janata Party, Gujarat (BJP Gujarat) is the state unit of the Bharatiya Janata Party that operates in Gujarat. C. R. Patil currently serves as  state president of the party. The leader of the party is Bhupendrabhai R Patel, the incumbent chief minister of Gujarat. The head office of the party is located in Gandhinagar, Gujarat.

Office bearers

Chief Ministers 

Following is the list of the chief ministers of Gujarat from Bhartiya Janta Party

Deputy Chief Minister 

Following is the list of the deputy chief ministers of Gujarat from Bhartiya Janta Party

President 
Following is the list of the presidents of Gujarat from Bhartiya Janta Party

Electoral History

Legislative Assembly election

Lok Sabha election

Manifesto History

2022 Manifesto:

 
 $1 trillion Economy and FDI: We will make Gujarat a $1 trillion economy by maintaining its pole position in manufacturing, focusing on services and investing in human and institutional capacity-building for new-age industries. We will attract ₹5 lakh crore foreign investment and make Gujarat the Defence and Aviation Manufacturing Hub of India.

 Urban Infrastructure Beautification: We will spend ₹25,000 crore under the Gujarat Urban Development Mission to transform the urban landscape with a focus on decongesting the existing cities (Satellite Townships) and increasing ease of living (Riverfront, Recreational Parks, Urban Forests, Traffic Management Systems) for citizens.

 Olympics in Gujarat: We will launch Gujarat Olympics Mission and create world-class sports infrastructure with an aim to host the Olympic Games in 2036.

 Agri Infra: We will invest ₹10,000 crore under Gujarat Krishi Infrastructure Kosh to develop a holistic system of Khedut Mandis, modern APMCs, sorting and grading units, cold chains, warehouses, primary processing centres, etc.

 Irrigration Project: We will invest ₹25,000 crore to expand the existing irrigation network through projects such as Sujalam Sufalam, SAUNI, lift irrigation projects, micro irrigation, drip irrigation and other systems across Gujarat.

 Gaushala: We will ensure holistic care for livestock by strengthening Gaushalas (additional budget of ₹500 crore), setting up 1,000 additional Mobile Veterinary Units and ensuring complete vaccination and insurance.

 Sea Food Park, corridor and Fishing Infra:We will set up 2 Sea Food Parks (one each in South Gujarat and Saurashtra), build India’s first Blue Economy Industrial Corridor and strengthen fishing related infrastructure (jetties, cold supply chain and mechanisation of boats).

 Healthcare: We will double the annual cap under the Pradhan Mantri Jan Arogya Yojana (Ayushman Bharat) from ₹5 lakh to ₹10 lakh per family and ensure free-of-cost medical treatment.

 Diagnostic Scheme: We will launch the Mukhyamantri Free Diagnostic Scheme with a corpus of ₹110 crore to provide free-of-cost diagnostic services in all government health institutions and empanelled laboratories for EWS households.

 Medical Colleges: We will create a ₹10,000 crore Maharaja Shri Bhagvatsinhji Swasthya Kosh to set up 3 Civil Medicities, 2 AIIMS-grade institutions, and upgrade infrastructure at existing healthcare facilities (Hospitals, CHCs and PHCs).

 Building School of Excellence: We will convert 20,000 government schools into Schools of Excellence with a budget of ₹10,000 crore in the next 5 years.

 Upgrading School Infra: We will launch Keshavram Kashiram Shastri Higher Education Transformation Fund with a budget of ₹1,000 crore, to construct new government colleges and revamp the existing colleges and universities with state-of-the-art facilities.

 20 lakh Jobs: We will provide 20 lakh employment opportunities to the youth of Gujarat in the next 5 years.

 4 Industrial College: We will establish 4 Gujarat Institute of Technology (GIT) on the lines of IITs as Centres of Excellence in the areas of Green Energy, Semiconductors, FinTech, and Aerospace.

 PM Awas Yojna-House Allocation: We will ensure that every citizen in Gujarat has a pucca house and ensure 100% implementation of the Pradhan Mantri Awas Yojana.

 Family Card Yojana: We will launch a Family Card Yojana, which will enable every family to avail benefits of all State Government-run welfare schemes.

 Ration: We will provide 1 litre of edible oil four times a year and 1 kg subsidised chana per month at subsidised rates through the PDS system.

 Ration Home Delivery: We will initiate mobile delivery of ration across all 56 Tribal Sub Plan Talukas.

 Tribals Development: We will spend ₹1 lakh crore under the Vanbandhu Kalyan Yojana 2.0 for the all-round socio-economic development of tribals.

 Religious Development: We will construct a Birsa Munda Adi Jati Samriddhi Corridor between Ambaji and Umergram to spur growth by connecting every tribal district’s headquarters with a 4-6 lane state highway, and by constructing a tribal cultural circuit to connect Pal Dadhvaav and the Statue of Unity to Shabari Dham.

 Building Medical Colleges: We will ensure state-of-the-art healthcare facilities in tribal areas by setting up 8 medical colleges, and 10 nursing/para-medical colleges.

 Set-up 8 GIDCs: We will set up 8 GIDCs in the tribal belt to generate employment opportunities for tribal youth.

 Edication: We will set up 25 Birsa Munda Gyan Shakti Residential Schools to provide the best residential schooling facilities to 75,000 meritorious students from the tribal community.

 Free Education: We will provide free-of-cost, quality education to all female students from KG to PG.

 Free E-scooters to Female: We will start Sharda Mehta Yojana to provide free two-wheelers (electric scooters) to meritorious college-going female students from financially weak households.

 Free Bus to Female: We will provide free bus travel to female senior citizens in the state.

 1 lakh Government Jobs: We will create more than 1 lakh government jobs for women in the next 5 years.

 Shramik Credit Cards: We will introduce Shramik Credit Cards for labourers to provide them with collateral-free loans up to ₹2 lakh.

 ₹50000 to ranker: We will provide a one-time incentive grant of ₹50,000 for OBC/ST/SC/EWS students who get into a NIRF top-ranking institution in India or a top-ranking world institution for higher education.

 Uniform Civil Code: We will ensure the complete implementation of the Gujarat Uniform Civil Code Committee’s recommendation.

 Anti-Radicalisation Cell: We will create an Anti-Radicalisation Cell to identify and eliminate potential threats, and sleeper cells of the terrorist organisations and anti-India forces.

 Pubilc-Privat Damage Recovery Act: We will enact the Gujarat Recovery of Damages of Public and Private Properties Act to recover damages done to public and private properties by anti-social elements during riots, violent protests, unrest, etc.

 Police Modernization: We will spend over ₹1,000 crore on Police Force modernisation to strengthen the physical infrastructure, purchasing best-in-class weapons and equipment, and building India’s most robust IT infrastructure.

 Highways: We will develop the first-of-its-kind Parikrama Path of 3,000 km encircling the whole state with 4-6 lane roads/ highways by constructing a South Eastern Peripheral Highway and North Western Peripheral Highway.

 Corridors: We will develop Gujarat Link Corridors by completing the missing links and augmenting the existing highways through the East-West Corridor connecting Dahod with Porbandar and North-South Corridor connecting Palanpur to Valsad.

 Exressway: We will develop a Saurashtra Express Highway Grid to provide seamless connectivity between important economic hubs and national highways.

 Metro: We will ensure time-bound completion of Gandhinagar and Surat Metro, and kick-start work on Saurashtra (Rajkot) and Central Gujarat’s (Vadodara) first metro rail service.

 Dharmic Infrastructure: We will build a Devbhumi Dwarka Corridor to establish it as western India’s biggest spiritual centre, comprising of the "World’s tallest Shree Krishna statue", a 3D immersive Bhagwat Gita experience zone and a viewing gallery for the lost city of Dwarka.

 Renovate Temples: We will invest ₹1,000 crore to renovate, expand and promote temples, following the successful transformation model of Somnath, Ambaji and Pavagadh.

 Cultural: We will invest ₹2,500 crore to promote Gujarat’s culture at the national and international levels by building museums, centres for performing arts, Sardar Patel Bhawan, etc.

2017 Manifesto:

Agri Proposals:
 Continue with the current policies for improving farm income
 To continue with Cooperative milk societies and animal welfare
 Effective implementation of law against cow slaughter

Youth Proposals:
 To open up more industrial cluster to increase Employment
 To encourage start-ups through skill development and Economic support
 Labour & remuneration policies to reflect current needs
 Along with govt policies to have results oriented employment policies
 To establish Gujarat Olympic Mission
 To create modern sports facilities and provide economic support for sports persons
 To encourage traditional sports

For Women:
 To set up a fund for women empowerment schemes
 Free higher education for women
 Healthcare facilities for women
 New women oriented policies
 To increase widow pension from time to time

Education Policy:
 To expand policies for welfare of girl child and schooling
 To expand foundational education
 To include new technological innovations in educations
 More importance to vocational education
 To better implement fee control in Private schools
 To create world class universities in the state

Healthcare:
 To provide better facilities for treatment of grave illnesses in district hospitals
 To increase availability of generic and affordable medicines
 To set up mobile clinics and 252 government diagnostic laboratories
 To free Gujarat of vector-borne diseases by 2022

Village Development:
 Cement houses for poor families
 All houses to have plumbing and toilet facilities
 To bring in waste disposal units
 Better transportation and connectivity for rural areas

Urban Development:
 Timely implementation of smart city projects
 Effective and smart traffic management systems
 Surat and Vadodhara to have metro train services
 Pipe gas connections in all houses
 AC- Bus services in major cities
 Playground facilities for children in all sectors
 Multi-level parking facilities
 Control on unlawful occupation of land

Industrial Policies:
 Policy based industrial growth
 Encouragement to Employment oriented industries
 Regulated policy for industries
 New policy for Semi-conductor and Telecommunications industries
 Government to collaborate with GIDC for global competitive industrial policies
 Better interest rates for SME lending
 To create help centres for entrepreneurs
 To ease licensing policy for Small traders via online
 Accounting services to be provided at affordable rates
 Considerable improvement in policies for co-operative societies
 Revival of closed co-operative units

Tribal Welfare:
 Effective implementation of tribal protection laws
 To create Tribal Development Board at district level
 To create registered Tribal committees
 To provide irrigation facilities in 4 lakh hectares of land in North-east tribal areas
 Special policies for Agariya communities
 Better implementation of PESA Act
 To provide land owner ship for all Tribals
 To set-up International levels tribal universities

OBC Welfare:
 To provide economic support for those in generational family businesses
 To double the grant for Thakore and Koli development corporation
 Expansion of Self-employement schemes

SC and ST Welfare:
 To create a committee for their betterment
 Easing of processes for obtaining caste certificate and BPL card
 Cement houses for everybody
 Better opportunity for education, healthcare and employment
 Creation of hawking zones for hawkers

Dalit Welfare:
 Effective protection of Dalits
 Economic support through Dr BhimRao Ambedkar Education fund
 Increase in schools
 Financial support for Dalit workers

Poor Labourers and Workers:
 100% coverage under Suraksha Bhima Yojana
 Cement Houses for all
 Affordable healthcare
 Affordable food policies to be expanded in cities

Financially Backward Communities:
 To fund secondary and high education of students
 Financial security through Jan Dhan and PM Suraksha Bima Yojana
 New policies for holistic development of poor
 Better opportunities for employment

Ports:
 Develop ports and better marine traffic routes
 To expand RORO ferry services
 To provide financial support to communities dependent on sea
 To give financial support for Modern equipment
 To create Marine product laboratory for improvement of manufacturing

Transparent and Better Governance:
 Administrative public outreach programme
 Karm-yogi Abhiyaan for Government employees
 Online services for registration and tax payment
 Forceful implementation of Anti-liquor policies

Tourism:
 To create Sardar Patel Statue at Karmsad
 New tourism circuits
 To create yoga and medication centre in Saurashtra in association with Somnath University
 To promote Handicraft festivals
 To create memorials for great Gujarati personalities
 Better facilities for Pilgrims

Cultural Policies:
 To promote language, literature and dance forms
 To promote ras-garba and traditional art forms
 To encourage music along with literature and language
 To create and expand Art festivals
 To reserve position in Girnar authority Board for saints
 To support for religious festivals like Maha Shivratri & Lili Parikarma

Senior Citizens:
 Timely increase in old-age pension
 To provide government services at home
 Expand the Shravan tirth policy

For NRI Gujarati:
 Gujarat tour services for NRIs
 To immediately resolve issues of NRIs
 To promote Gujarati cultural activities outside India

See also
Bharatiya Janata Party
National Democratic Alliance
Bharatiya Jana Sangh

References 

Bharatiya Janata Party
Narendra Modi
Gujarat Legislative Assembly
Gujarat-related lists
Gujarat